Marquee Broadcasting, Inc. is a small broadcasting company which owns several television stations in the United States.

History
Marquee began in 2013 when its owners, Brian and Patricia Lane, announced its intent to acquire WMDT and its repeater, WEVD-LP for $9 million.

The company's next acquisition came in 2015 when it closed its acquisition of WUGA-TV from the University of Georgia for $2.5 million. Following the acquisition, the station's primary affiliation changed to Heroes & Icons and changed its callsign to WGTA.

In May 2016, Nexstar Broadcasting Group announced its sale of KREG-TV to Marquee Broadcasting.

On April 5, 2017, Max Media announced that it entered an agreement to sell NBC affiliate WNKY in Bowling Green, Kentucky to Marquee.

On June 18, 2018, Marquee agreed to purchase WSST-TV in Cordele, Georgia from Sunbelt-South Communications, Ltd. The sale is expected to be approved by the FCC and close by the end of Fall 2018. On August 16, 2018, Gray Television announced that it would sell WSWG, the CBS affiliate for Albany, Georgia, to Marquee; Marquee intends to combine WSST and WSWG's operations.

On April 20, 2022, it was announced that Southeastern Ohio Broadcasting Corporation will sell their TV station WHIZ-TV, along with radio stations WHIZ, WHIZ-FM, and WZVL to Marquee Broadcasting for an undisclosed amount. The sale was completed on July 15.

Stations

Current

Television

Radio

Former

References

 
Television broadcasting companies of the United States
Radio broadcasting companies of the United States
Privately held companies based in Maryland
Mass media companies established in 2013